Nicholas Westbrook-Ikhine (born March 21, 1997) is an American football wide receiver for the Tennessee Titans of the National Football League (NFL). He played college football at Indiana.

Early life and high school
Westbrook-Ikhine grew up in Lake Mary, Florida and attended Lake Mary High School.

College career
Westbrook-Ikhine was a member of the Indiana Hoosiers for five seasons. He had six receptions for 69 yards and one touchdown as a true freshman. As a sophomore, Westbrook-Ikhine caught 54 passes for 995 yards (18.4 yards per catch) and six touchdowns. He tore his ACL during the first play of his junior year and used a medical redshirt. Westbrook-Ikhine led Indiana with 590 receiving yards with 42 receptions and scored four touchdowns the following season.  As a redshirt senior, he caught 42 passes for 572 yards and five touchdowns. Westbrook-Ikhine finished his collegiate career with 144 receptions for 2,226 yards and 16 touchdowns.

Collegiate statistics

Professional career

Westbrook-Ikhine was signed by the Tennessee Titans as an undrafted free agent on April 26, 2020. He was waived at the end of training camp during final roster cuts on September 5, 2020, but was signed by to the team's practice squad the following day. He was elevated to the active roster on September 14 for the team's Week 1 game against the Denver Broncos, and reverted to the practice squad the next day. He was promoted to the active roster on September 16, 2020. Westbrook-Ikhine finished his rookie season with three receptions for 33 yards in 14 regular season games played.

Westbrook-Ikhine's role expanded in the 2021 season. He totaled 38 receptions for 476 yards and four touchdowns in 16 games. Westbrook-Ikhine enjoyed his first career 100-yard game on November 23, 2021, against the Houston Texans in a game that saw injuries down fellow receivers Marcus Johnson and A. J. Brown. Westbrook-Ikhine collected 7 receptions and 107 yards on 8 targets in the 13-22 loss.

On March 9, 2022, the Titans re-signed Westbrook-Ikhine to a one-year deal. In Week 10 against the Denver Broncos, he had five receptions for 119 receiving yards and two receiving touchdowns in the 17–10 victory. He finished the 2022 season with 25 receptions for 397 receiving yards and three receiving touchdowns.

On March 16, 2023, Westbrook-Ikhine signed another one-year contract with the Titans.

NFL career statistics

References

External links

Tennessee Titans bio
Indiana Hoosiers bio

1997 births
Living people
American football wide receivers
Indiana Hoosiers football players
People from Lake Mary, Florida
Players of American football from Florida
Sportspeople from Seminole County, Florida
Tennessee Titans players
Ed Block Courage Award recipients